KSR may refer to:

 Kam Sheung Road station, Hong Kong; MTR station code
 Kendall Square Research, former supercomputer company, Cambridge, Massachusetts, US
 Keyboard Send Receive, a type of teleprinter made by Teletype Corporation 
 KSR v. Teleflex, a US patent lawsuit
 Katahdin Scout Reservation, a BSA camp in Maine, US
 King Shaka Regiment, an infantry regiment of the South African Army
 Korean State Railway, North Korea state railways
 KSR1 (kinase suppressor of Ras 1), an enzyme and gene
 Kim Stanley Robinson, science fiction writer